Warren McKenzie (born 31 July 1964) is a former Australian rules footballer who played for Carlton and Sydney in the Victorian and Australian Football Leagues.

McKenzie made his senior VFL debut halfway through the 1985 VFL season, against Footscray. He played 67 games for Carlton, including the 1987 VFL Grand Final. After the 1990 AFL season he was transferred to Sydney where he spent two seasons before being delisted. In 1993 McKenzie played for Victorian Football Association (VFA) club Sandringham.

His son Reece was draft by Richmond in 2014 and spent two years at the club before retiring in 2016.

References

External links

1964 births
Living people
Australian rules footballers from Victoria (Australia)
Carlton Football Club players
Carlton Football Club Premiership players
Sydney Swans players
Sandringham Football Club players
One-time VFL/AFL Premiership players